The 2007 Pan American Race Walking Cup was held in Balneário Camboriú, Santa Catarina, Brazil.  The track of the Cup runs in the Avenida Atlântica.

A detailed report was given.
Complete results were published.

Medallists

Results

Men's 20 km

*: Started as a guest out of competition.

Team

Men's 50 km

*: Started as a guest out of competition.

Team

Men's 10 km (Junior)

*: Started as a guest out of competition.

Team

Women's 20 km

*: Started as a guest out of competition.

Team

Women's 10 km (Junior)

*: Started as a guest out of competition.

Team

Participation
The participation of 97 athletes from 14 countries is reported.

 (2)
 (1)
 (17)
 (3)
 (5)
 (12)
 (16)
 (5)
 México (12)
 Panamá (1)
 (1)
 Perú (2)
 (1)
 (17)

See also
 2007 Race Walking Year Ranking

References

Pan American Race Walking Cup
Pan American Race Walking Cup
Pan American Race Walking Cup
International athletics competitions hosted by Brazil
Balneário Camboriú